Galugah (also Romanized as Galūgāh) is a city and capital of Galugah County, Mazandaran Province, Iran.  At the 2006 census, its population was 18,720, in 4,927 families. The population of Galugah speak Mazandarani and  Azerbaijani languages.

Galugah is placed on northern slopes of Alborz mountain chain and because it is close to the Caspian sea from the other side, its atmosphere is mainly humid and damp.

References

Populated places in Galugah County
Cities in Mazandaran Province